Canaschal Castle is a pair of ruined castles near Trin, Canton of Graubünden, Switzerland.

Castle name
Confusingly the name Canaschal is not consistently used for this castle.  It is also referred to individually as Hohentrins Castle or together with Sogn Parcazi also as Hohentrins.  Additionally Hohentrin could refer to the region around Trin.

History

Very little is known about the history of Canaschal Castle though local tradition holds that Pepin, the father of Charlemagne, was the founder of the castle.  It may have been built as part of the defensive complex around Trin or as a refuge castle once the fortified church on Sogn Parcazi (Romansh: St. Pancras' rock) became a feudal castle and could no longer be used as a refuge.  The castle may have also been built to guard the road to the Surselva region.

In the 10th century Emperor Otto I combined the imperial estates of Trin, Tamins and Reichenau, Switzerland into the Herrschaft of Hohentrin and granted it to Reichenau Abbey.  The Abbey appointed the Freiherr von Frauenberg to oversee the region.  After their extinction the Freiherr von Wildenberg was appointed as the Abbey's representative.  In the 14th century the Wildenbergs were forced to give the Herrschaft and castle or castles as collateral to the Freiherr von Rhäzüns.  They bought the Herrschaft back from Rhäzüns in 1383 but were forced to use it as collateral again in 1399 and then completely sell it in 1425 to the Freiherr von Höwen.  After a fire destroyed Sogn Parcazi on 2 July 1470 the vogt may have moved to Canaschal Castle.  Vogts continued to live in Trin until at least 1529, though it is unclear whether they lived at Canaschal or elsewhere in the village.

In the 16th century Ulrich Campell's chronicle records that there were two castles in Trin, Hohentrins and Pobiesch which probably referred to Sogn Parcazi and Canaschal respectively.

Castle site

The tower is about three stories tall and has a high entrance on the south side. One of the corner stones on the south-west corner was supposed to have had the face of a crowned king, representing Pepin the Short, chiseled into it. However the image is heavily weathered and is now invisible. It was probably built in the early 13th century.

The eastern tower stands on the highest point of the hill and is almost completely destroyed. Only the south-east corner is still standing. It was probably built in the 12th century.

Gallery

See also
 List of castles in Switzerland

Notes 
1.Local tradition claims King Pepin (c. 714 – 24 September 768), father of Charlemagne as founder of the castle.

References

External links

Trin
Castles in Graubünden
Ruined castles in Switzerland